Parsonage Down is a 188.6 hectare biological Site of Special Scientific Interest in Wiltshire, England, notified in 1971.

Description 
The site is a national nature reserve in recognition of its importance as part of the Salisbury Plain landscape and calcareous grassland it supports.

Parsonage Down and Cherry Lodge Farm together form the only farm directly managed by Natural England. The farm is run for the benefit of wildlife and conservation within the SSSI and NNR, and is home to the oldest registered herd of English Longhorn cattle in the United Kingdom.

Following the introduction of the Countryside and Rights of Way Act, the whole of the site was designated "access land" and is, therefore, open to public access.

Biological interest

The site has the largest population of burnt orchid (Neotinea ustulata) in northwest Europe.

Sources

 Natural England citation sheet for the site (accessed 11 April 2022)

References

External links
 Natural England website (SSSI information)
 Parsonage Down National Nature Reserve

Sites of Special Scientific Interest in Wiltshire
Sites of Special Scientific Interest notified in 1971